The 2022 Liga 3 South Sulawesi is the fifth edition of Liga 3 South Sulawesi organized by Asprov PSSI South Sulawesi.

Followed by 17 clubs. The winner of this competition will immediately advance to the national round.

Gasma Enrekang is the defending champion after winning it in the 2021 season.

Teams

Venues 
Persesos Sorowako Stadium, East Luwu Regency
La Patau Stadium, Bone Regency
Andi Mappe Stadium, Pangkajene and Islands Regency
Hikmat Takalala Ground, Soppeng Regency

First round

Group A

Group B

Group C

Group D

Knockout round 
Wait for the completion of the group stage first.

References 

Liga 3
Sport in South Sulawesi